Palace Lodge may refer to:

Palace Lodge (Winslow, Indiana)
Palace Lodge (Gallup, New Mexico), part of the Gallup Commercial Historic District